A consensual response is any reflex observed on one side of the body when the other side has been stimulated.

For example, if an individual's right eye is shielded and light shines into the left eye, constriction of the right pupil will occur, as well as the left. This is because the afferent signal sent through one optic nerve connects to the Edinger-Westphal nucleus, whose axons run to both the right and the left oculomotor nerves.

See also 
Pupillary light reflex - Clinical significance section.

References

Reflexes
Medicine articles needing expert attention